Jack Vard (29 May 1926 – 13 April 1998) was an Irish wrestler. He competed in the men's freestyle lightweight at the 1952 Summer Olympics.

References

1926 births
1998 deaths
Irish male sport wrestlers
Olympic wrestlers of Ireland
Wrestlers at the 1952 Summer Olympics
Sportspeople from Dublin (city)
20th-century Irish people